Robbah is a town and commune, and capital of Robbah District, in El Oued Province, Algeria. According to the 2008 census it has a population of 21,965, up from 17,243 in 1998, and an annual growth rate of 2.5%.

Climate 

Robbah has a hot desert climate (Köppen climate classification BWh), with very hot summers and mild winters. Rainfall is light and sporadic, and summers are particularly dry.

Education 

7.2% of the population has a tertiary education, and another 16.4% has completed secondary education. The overall literacy rate is 79.6%, and is 87.3% among males and 71.6% among females.

Localities 
The commune of Robbah is composed of four localities:

 Robbah
 Débidibi
 Beghazlia
 Guédachi

References 

Neighbouring towns and cities

Communes of El Oued Province
Cities in Algeria
Algeria